Bondage is a 1933 pre-Code American drama film directed by Alfred Santell and written by Arthur Kober and Doris Malloy. The film stars Dorothy Jordan, Alexander Kirkland, Merle Tottenham, Nydia Westman, Jane Darwell, and Edward Woods. The film was released on March 31, 1933, by Fox Film Corporation.

Cast        
Dorothy Jordan as Judy Peters
Alexander Kirkland as Dr. Nelson
Merle Tottenham as Ruth
Nydia Westman as Irma
Jane Darwell as Mrs. Elizabeth Wharton
Edward Woods as Earl Crawford
Isabel Jewell as Beulah
Dorothy Libaire as Maizie
Rafaela Ottiano as Miss Trigge

References

External links 
 

1933 films
1930s English-language films
Fox Film films
American drama films
1933 drama films
Films directed by Alfred Santell
American black-and-white films
1930s American films